P. robustus  may refer to:
 Paranthropus robustus, an extinct hominin species dated to have lived between 2.0 and 1.2 million years ago
 Paraptenodytes robustus, an extinct penguin species found in Early Miocene rocks of the Patagonian Molasse Formation
 Poicephalus robustus, the cape parrot, a parrot species
 Psilorhynchus robustus, an Asian freshwater fish species found in Burma

Synonyms
 Ptychostomus robustus, a synonym for Moxostoma robustum, the robust redhorse or smallfin redhorse, a freshwater fish species of the eastern United States

See also
 Robustus (disambiguation)